Tiffin Township is one of the fifteen townships of Adams County, Ohio, United States. As of the 2010 census, the population was 5,560.

Geography
Located in the center of the county, it borders the following townships:
Oliver Township - north
Meigs Township- northeast
Brush Creek Township - east
Monroe Township - south
Liberty Township - west
Wayne Township - northwest

Most of the village of West Union, the county seat of Adams County, is located in southwestern Tiffin Township.

Name and history
Tiffin Township was organized in 1806. It is named for Edward Tiffin, first Governor of Ohio.

Statewide, the only other Tiffin Township is located in Defiance County.

Government
The township is governed by a three-member board of trustees, who are elected in November of odd-numbered years to a four-year term beginning on the following January 1. Two are elected in the year after the presidential election and one is elected in the year before it. There is also an elected township fiscal officer, who serves a four-year term beginning on April 1 of the year after the election, which is held in November of the year before the presidential election. Vacancies in the fiscal officership or on the board of trustees are filled by the remaining trustees.

References

External links
County website

Townships in Adams County, Ohio
1806 establishments in Ohio
Townships in Ohio